Santiago Gustavo Pedro Cortés (born 25 July 1954) is a Mexican politician formerly from the Social Democratic Party. From 2006 to 2009 he served as Deputy of the LX Legislature of the Mexican Congress representing  the Federal District.

References

1954 births
Living people
People from Oaxaca
Members of the Chamber of Deputies (Mexico)
Social Democratic Party (Mexico) politicians
21st-century Mexican politicians
Deputies of the LX Legislature of Mexico